Swanson Stadium is a baseball park located on the campus of Florida Gulf Coast University in Fort Myers, Florida, next to Alico Arena, the school's basketball facility.

Opened in 2004, the stadium was renamed in 2005 for Duane and Cookie Swanson, local civic leaders and FGCU supporters.

See also
 List of NCAA Division I baseball venues

References

External links
 Swanson Stadium

College baseball venues in the United States
Baseball venues in Florida
Buildings and structures in Fort Myers, Florida
Florida Gulf Coast Eagles baseball
Sports venues in Fort Myers, Florida
2004 establishments in Florida
Sports venues completed in 2004